Nathaniel "Danny" Walters (23 May 1875 – 22 February 1956) was a Welsh rugby union forward who played club rugby for Llanelli and international rugby for Wales.

Rugby career
Walters was awarded his one and only international cap while representing his home team of Llanelli. He was chosen for the opening game of the 1902 Home Nations Championship which was played away from home against England. Walters was one of seven new caps for Wales for the game, including Doctor Teddy Morgan on the wing. Joining Walters in the pack were international debuts for Will Osborne, Will Joseph, Arthur Harding and Dai "Tarw" Jones. Adding to the unfamiliarity of the forwards was the fact that of the eight men, only Jehoida Hodges and George Boots played for the same club as each other. Under the captaincy of Gwyn Nicholls, the Welsh were victorious by a single point, thanks to a penalty goal from John Strand-Jones. Despite the win, Walters was the only member of the Welsh pack to lose his place for the next game, being replaced by Harry Jones of Penygraig. Although Walter did not play any further international matches, the Wales team won all three Home Nations matches that season, making Walters a Triple Crown winning player.

Walters continued to play for Llanelli long after his international career came to an end, and captained his club's first team through three seasons; 1901–02, 1902–03 and 1906-07. In 1906, Walters led Llanelli against Paul Roos touring South African team at Stradey Park.

International games played
Wales
  1902

Bibliography

Further reading
Gareth Hughes (1983) One hundred years of scarlet (Llanelli Rugby Football Club)

References

1875 births
1956 deaths
Felinfoel RFC players
Llanelli RFC players
Publicans
Rugby union forwards
Rugby union players from Llanelli
Wales international rugby union players
Welsh rugby union players